Stomatoporina is a genus of stenolaematan bryozoans. The type species is Stomatoporina incurvata. Like almost all bryozoans, it is colonial.

Species
There are three species:
 Stomatoporina incurvata (Hincks, 1859)
 Stomatoporina lamii Balavoine, 1958
 Stomatoporina roberti Balavoine, 1958

References 

Cyclostomatida
Stenolaemata genera
Extant Middle Jurassic first appearances